The 2018 GOLDLINE Icebreaker at The Granite was held from August 24 to 26 at the Granite Curling Club in Winnipeg, Manitoba. It was the second event on the World Curling Tour for the 2018–19 season. The men's event was held in a double knockout format and the women's event was held in a round robin format.

On the men's side, Braden Calvert's rink from Winnipeg defeated John Shuster's team from Duluth 4–3 in the final. Team Calvert also won the event the previous season. On the women's side, Team Darcy Robertson also from Winnipeg defeated Russia's Anna Sidorova from Moscow 9–8 in the final. Team Robertson finished runner-up at the event in 2017.

Men
The teams are listed as follows:

Teams

Round-robin standings
Final round-robin standings

Round-robin results
All draw times are listed in Central Time (UTC−06:00).

Draw 1
Friday, August 24, 6:00 pm

Draw 2
Friday, August 24, 9:00 pm

Draw 4
Saturday, August 25, 3:30 pm

Draw 5
Saturday, August 25, 7:00 pm

Playoffs

Semifinals
Sunday, August 26, 12:00 pm

Final
Sunday, August 26, 3:00 pm

Women
The teams are listed as follows:

Teams

Round-robin standings
Final round-robin standings

Round-robin results
All draw times are listed in Central Time (UTC−06:00).

Draw 1
Friday, August 24, 6:00 pm

Draw 2
Friday, August 24, 9:00 pm

Draw 3
Saturday, August 25, 12:00 pm

Draw 4
Saturday, August 25, 3:30 pm

Draw 5
Saturday, August 25, 7:00 pm

Playoffs

Quarterfinal
Sunday, August 26, 9:00 am

Semifinals
Sunday, August 26, 12:00 pm

Final
Sunday, August 26, 3:00 pm

References

External links
Men's Results
Women's Results

Curling competitions in Winnipeg
2018 in Canadian curling
2018 in Manitoba
August 2018 sports events in Canada